The San Martino in Pensilis station is a railway station on the Termoli-Campobasso line.

Serve the town of San Martino in Pensilis.

The station is closed and in abandoned state.

Bibliography
Rete Ferroviaria Italiana. Fascicolo Linea 138

External links

This article is based upon a translation of the Italian language version as at May 2017.

Railway stations in Molise